Osvaldo "Ossie" Ocasio (born August 12, 1955) is a Puerto Rican former boxer who held the world cruiserweight championship. Nicknamed "Jaws", his peculiar nickname was the result of him accidentally biting another boxer during a sparring session.

Heavyweight contender
Ocasio campaigned in the heavyweight division, turning pro in 1976 and putting together 10 wins before signing with Don King and making a name for himself outpointing King fighter Kevin Isaac.

In 1978 on the undercard of the Larry Holmes/Ken Norton title fight Ocasio scored a major upset when he outpointed the highly regarded Jimmy Young, who'd outpointed George Foreman only a while back. In a rematch, Ocasio underlined his superiority by again outpointing a this time in-shape Young, in Puerto Rico. It was Ocasio's career high in the Heavyweight division.

This earned him his only world heavyweight title shot, against Larry Holmes in 1979. Attempting to become the first Hispanic to win the world Heavyweight championship, Ocasio was badly outclassed and was knock out in the seventh round.

In 1980 he fought red hot undefeated prospect Michael Dokes, and was unlucky to only get a draw. However a rematch saw Ocasio surprisingly knocked out in 1 round. The following year he travelled to the UK and made little effort against local prospect John L. Gardner, before collapsing without getting hit in the 6th round.

Cruiserweight World Champion

He later went down in weight, to fight in the then newly created division of the Cruiserweights. In 1982 he was matched with Robbie Williams in South Africa for the vacant WBA title. Ocasio became a world champion by beating Williams by a 15-round unanimous decision. He shared honors as world champion of that division with countryman Carlos De León, the WBC world champion.

Ocasio made three successful defenses, winning 15-round decisions over Young Joe Louis and Randy Stephens, appearing on Jet Magazine the week before the Stephens bout, and knocking out John Odhiambo in the 15th round in Guaynabo, Puerto Rico. After the bout Ocasio turned down a fight with Great Britain fighter David Pearce, after Morgans Palle had provided contracts to make the fight and Ocasio had previously signed to. He decided to return to South Africa, where he lost his title to Piet Crous by a 15-round decision. One month before losing the title, his brother had been murdered.

Ocasio, during his championship run, was able to buy a house in Trujillo Alto, where he maintained a large farm. He also participated in a Puerto Rican movie, playing a slave in the production.

In 1986, he made a comeback, winning two fights including a 10-round decision over former world champion Dwight Muhammad Qawi in Atlantic City. Most fans had Qawi winning all 10 rounds, and this is considered one of the worst decisions in boxing history.  He attempted to regain his world championship against Evander Holyfield in Marseille, France, but lost by a knockout in 11 rounds.

Return to Heavyweight
He returned to the heavyweight division in 1988, defeating Pierre Coetzer in South Africa, but losing the decision in a rematch. After this fight he was relegated to trialhorse status.

In 1989 he made Ray Mercer look bad, losing an 8-round decision. In 1990 he dropped decisions to Tyrell Biggs and Bruce Seldon, then travelled to the UK for two fights losing and being the first opponent to take Lennox Lewis to the distance and scoring an upset when stopping Jess Harding in 8 rounds. Ocasio then travelled to Australia, where he was outpointed by the erratic Mike Hunter.

One last comeback in 1992 resulted in a dreary points loss to ex-contender Carl Williams, but it was hard hitting Hispanic prospect Alex Garcia who convinced the usually durable Ocasio to retire- he decked Ocasio several times before knocking him out in the 8th.

He retired from boxing with a record of 23 wins, 13 losses and 1 draw, with 12 knockout wins. He currently resides in Orlando, Florida.

Professional boxing record

See also

List of cruiserweight boxing champions
List of Puerto Rican boxing world champions

References

External links

1955 births
Living people
Cruiserweight boxers
Heavyweight boxers
World cruiserweight boxing champions
World Boxing Association champions
People from Carolina, Puerto Rico
Puerto Rican male boxers